Luis Matte Valdés (5 April 1933 – 5 March 2019) was a Chilean politician who served as Mayor of La Florida and later as national Minister of Housing and Urbanism in the Presidency of Salvador Allende.

References

Mayors of places in Chile
2019 deaths
1933 births
Matte family
Government ministers of Chile